Monksville may refer to:

Monksville Reservoir, in Passaic County, New Jersey
Monksville, New Jersey, a defunct community flooded by the above reservoir